This is a list of renamed places in Chad

Cities and towns 
 Faya → Largeau → Faya-Largeau (1960)
 Fort-Foureau → Kousséri
 Fort-Lamy → N'Djamena (1973)
 Fort-Archambault → Sarh

Proposed 
 Faya-Largeau → Faya

See also 
 Geographical renaming
 Lists of renamed places
 List of city name changes

Geography of Chad
History of Chad
Chad
Chad, renamed places
Renamed places
Chad
Chad